Ojiambo is a surname. Notable people with the surname include: 

 Ainea Ojiambo (born 1970), Kenyan actor
 Josephine Ojiambo (born 1961), Kenyan ambassador to the United Nations
 Julia Ojiambo, Orange Democratic Movement candidate
 Sanda Ojiambo, Kenyan administrator 
 Meshack Ojiambo Okumu, Kenyan political Strategist, Analyst and Commentator